Grass River or Grasse River may refer to:

 Grass River (Michigan), USA
 Grasse River, New York, USA
 Grass River (Manitoba), a tributary of the Nelson River in Canada
 Grass River Provincial Park, Manitoba, Canada